Kocher is a German surname. Notable people with the surname include:

Emil Theodor Kocher (1841–1917), Swiss surgeon and Nobel prize winner
Martina Kocher, Swiss luger
Paul Kocher, American cryptographer
Paul H. Kocher, German-US author
Zina Kocher, Canadian biathlete

German-language surnames